Bula was an unincorporated community in Monongalia County, West Virginia, United States. Its post office no longer exists.

References 

Unincorporated communities in West Virginia
Former populated places in West Virginia